Holy Trinity Church is a Grade II* listed  parish church in the Church of England in Birchfield, Birmingham.
The church building was placed on a Heritage at Risk Register due to its poor condition in 2018, but repairs led to its removal from this register.

History

The foundation stone was laid on 26 May 1863, and the church was built by the architect J. A. Chatwin and builders Briggs & Son of rock faced red sandstone with white limestone bands and dressings. It was consecrated on 17 May 1864, by John Lonsdale, the Bishop of Lichfield. It was built for a congregation of 612 people. The building is 117 ft long, 48.5 ft wide.

The church has a good collection of stained glass by the best Victorian manufacturers including Clayton and Bell; Heaton, Butler and Bayne; John Hardman; and Alexander Gibbs of Bedford.

A parish was assigned in 1865 out of St Mary's Church, Handsworth. In 1926, part of the parish was taken to form a parish for All Souls' Church, Witton.

Eve Pitts became the vicar of the church in 2010 and a grant was obtained from the National Lottery Heritage Fund to assist repairs to the church building. In 2018, the church building, especially the roof, had been placed on Historic England's Heritage at Risk Register due to its poor condition, but the repairs have led to its removal from this register.

Organ

The church contained an organ dating from 1866 by Banfield. A specification of the organ can be found on the National Pipe Organ Register.

References

External links
 

Church of England church buildings in Birmingham, West Midlands
Grade II* listed buildings in Birmingham
19th-century Church of England church buildings
Grade II* listed churches in the West Midlands (county)